In Norse mythology, Okolnir ("Never Cold") is a plain on which is located the hall of Brimir and mentioned only in stanza 37 of the poem Völuspá from the Poetic Edda. The location of this plain is not stated in the poem.

References
Larrington, Carolyne (transl.) (1996). The Poetic Edda. Oxford World's Classics. .

Locations in Norse mythology
Plains